is an animation studio with its headquarters in Toyotamanaka, Nerima, Tokyo, Japan. It was established on January 21, 1986.

Notable staff
 Hiroshi Kanazawa (animation director, character designer) 
 Kazuo Harada (animation producer, sound effects and audio director)
 Shin Misawa (animation)

Productions

See also

References

External links
 Official website 
 

Animation studios in Tokyo
Japanese animation studios
Mass media companies established in 1986
Japanese companies established in 1986
Nerima